The 1989 Mercedes Cup,  was a men's tennis tournament played on outdoor clay courts and held at the Tennis Club Weissenhof in Stuttgart, West Germany that was part of the 1989 Grand Prix circuit. It was the 12th edition of the tournament was held from 24 July until 30 July 1989. Fourteenth-seeded Martín Jaite won the singles title.

Finals

Singles
 Martín Jaite defeated  Goran Prpić, 6–3, 6–2
 It was Jaite's 1st singles title of the year and the 6th of his career.

Doubles
 Petr Korda /  Tomáš Šmíd defeated  Florin Segărceanu /  Cyril Suk, 6–7, 6–3, 6–1

References

External links
 Official website 
 ATP tournament profile

Stuttgart Open
Stuttgart Open
1989 in German tennis
July 1989 sports events in Europe